The Trade Development Authority of Pakistan (TDAP), is a department within the Ministry of Commerce and Textile Industry of the Government of Pakistan. It facilitates and promotes international trade of Pakistan.

Background 
The department was established on 8 November 2006 under a Presidential Ordinance, as a successor organization to the Export Promotion Bureau, which was established in 1963. The TDAP is mandated to have a larger view of global trade development, rather than only the export promotion - together with its 14 regional offices, the department performs facilitation and regulatory functions as well as providing supply side and marketing assistance to exporters. It arranges awareness seminars and workshops to educate the Pakistani business community about the latest conditions and trends in the global markets.

Exports and trade shows
In 2011, Pakistan's exports of stones, marble, granites to China doubled due to effective marketing strategies developed by TDAP.

On a regular basis, TDAP facilitates and encourages Pakistani business community to exhibit their products at all major trade shows in Pakistan including at Karachi Expo Centre and Lahore Expo Center.

E-commerce
In 2017, Trade Development Authority of Pakistan (TDAP) signed a 'Memorandum of Understanding' with the China-based Alibaba Group to promote exports through e-commerce.

References

External links
Trade Development Authority of Pakistan official website
About TDAP

Foreign trade of Pakistan
Pakistan federal departments and agencies
Export promotion agencies
2006 establishments in Pakistan
Government agencies established in 2006
Ministry of Commerce (Pakistan)